Lee Joon-hee (Hangul: 이준희, born June 23, 1992), better known by his stage name Killagramz (Hangul: 킬라그램), is a Korean-American rapper. He was a contestant on Show Me the Money 5 and Show Me the Money 6 . He released his first album, Faint, on June 10, 2017.

Discography

Extended plays

Singles

References

1992 births
Living people
South Korean male rappers
South Korean hip hop singers
21st-century South Korean  male singers